Cordusio is a station on Line 1 of the Milan Metro in the busy, commercial Piazzale Cordusio. It was opened on 1 November 1964 as part of the inaugural section of the Metro, between Sesto Marelli and Lotto. The station is near the piazza del Duomo, and the long via Dante, which leads up to the Castello Sforzesco.

As with the square in which it is located, it takes its name from the Curia Ducis, the Court of Duke: this name dates back to the Longobard period.

References

External links

Line 1 (Milan Metro) stations
Railway stations opened in 1964
1964 establishments in Italy
Railway stations in Italy opened in the 20th century